Capitaine Paul Adrien Gastin (8 November 1886 - 23 August 1976) was a World War I French flying ace credited with six confirmed aerial victories and four probable ones. Having attained command of both a squadron and a wing, and reaching the rank of captain by war's end, he remained in service. After postings to Morocco and Tunisia, he rose to the rank of general.

Biography
See also Aerial victory standards of World War I

Paul Adrien Gastin was born on 8 November 1886 in Vaucluse, France. He began his mandated military service on 1 October 1907. After a couple of promotions within the enlisted ranks, he was commissioned into the reserves as a Sous lieutenant on 1 April 1909. By the time the First World War began in 1914, and he was recalled to active duty, Gastin was a full lieutenant.

Detached from the 9th Regiment de Chausseurs on 24 February 1915, he was posted to aviation duties. On 1 September 1915, his student pilot days were capped with the award of Military Pilot's Brevet No. 1484. After advanced training, he was assigned to Escadrille N.49 on 15 January 1916.

On 22 May 1916, before aerial victories had become common occurrences, Gastin scored his first victory, over a German Aviatik.

January 1917 was a busy month for Gastin. He scored his fourth and fifth confirmed victories, on the 23rd and 28rd; then on the 31st, he was assigned to command Escadrille N.84. He would not score his last victory until 17 August 1918. A week later, he was promoted from squadron command to leadership of a wing, Groupe de Combat 23.

After war's end, Gastin served in Morocco and Tunisia and rose from captain to general. By the time of his death in Nice on 23 August 1976, he had risen to Commandeur of the Legion d'Honneur. He had also been granted the Croix de Guerre with eight palmes and an etoile de bronze.

Aerial victories

Sources of information

References
 .

1886 births
1976 deaths
French World War I flying aces
Recipients of the Croix de Guerre 1914–1918 (France)
Commandeurs of the Légion d'honneur